Animation Nation is an annual film festival in Singapore featuring animation feature films, short films, seminars and workshops. The festival was created by the Singapore Film Society in 2004 and took place every year until 2011. The latest edition was held from 21-22 November 2022.

Besides films from around the world, the festival also screens local animation works in a programme called Singapore Showcase. This is to promote talents in Singapore and bring awareness to the public.

History 
Animation Nation stopped in 2012 and returned in 2016.

2004 (24 to 29 June)

Film Programme 
Feature films
 Hair High (2004) by Bill Plympton
 A Winter's Tale / 冬の日 (2003) by Kawamoto Kihachirō / 川本 喜八郎 et al.
 My Life as McDull / 麥兜故事 (2001) by Toe Yuen
 Belleville Rendez-vous (2003) by Sylvain Chomet
 Matsumoto Leiji / 松本 零士 and Daft Punk's Interstella 5555: The 5tory of the 5ecret 5tar 5ystem (2003)
 Invasion: Anime (2002 documentary) by Angela Alexander

Selected Short films
 She and Her Cat: Their Standing Points / 彼女と彼女の猫 (1999) by Shinkai Makoto / 新海 誠
 Voices of a Distant Star / ほしのこえ (2002) by Shinkai Makoto / 新海 誠
 Doggy Poo / 강아지 똥 (2003) by Kwon Oh-sung
 Harvie Krumpet (2003) by Adam Elliot
 Father and Daughter (2000) by Michaël Dudok de Wit
 The Monk and the Fish (1994) by Michaël Dudok de Wit
 Tom Sweep (1992) by Michaël Dudok de Wit

2005 (17 to 23 November)

Selected Film Programme 
 Wallace and Gromit: The Curse of the Were-Rabbit (2005) by Nick Park and Steve Box
 Wallace and Gromit short films: A Grand Day Out (1989), The Wrong Trousers (1993), A Close Shave (1995)
 Mind Game (2004) by Yuasa Masaaki / 湯浅 政明
 McDull, Prince de la Bun / 麥兜菠蘿油王子 (2004) by Toe Yuen
 The Place Promised in Our Early Days / 雲のむこう、約束の場所 (2004) by Shinkai Makoto / 新海 誠
 Jonathan Nix Animation Showcase
 Ninja Tunes Retrospective
 In the Realms of the Unreal (2004 documentary) by Jessica Yu
 The District (2004) by Áron Gauder
 Kakurenbo / カクレンボ (2004) by Morita Shuuhei / 森田 修平
 Aeon Flux shorts

2006 (16 to 22 November)

Festival Highlights (Bill Plympton Retrospective) 
Director in attendance: Bill Plympton

Film Programme 
Bill Plympton Retrospective
 Feature film The Tune (1992)
 Short films including Your Face (1987) and Guard Dog (2004)
 Bill Plympton's Animation Master class

Feature films
 Renaissance (2006) by Christian Volckman
 Paprika / パプリカ (2006) by Kon Satoshi / 今 敏
 Nagasaki 1945 - The Angelus Bells / 長崎 1945 アンゼラスの鐘 (2005) by Arihara Seiji / 有原 誠治

Selected Short films
 Animation Runner Kuromi / アニメ制作進行くろみちゃん (2001) by Daichi Akitarō / 大地 丙太郎
 Animation Runner Kuromi 2 (2004) by Daichi Akitarō / 大地 丙太郎
 Moongirl (2005) by Henry Selick
 The Moon and the Son: An Imagined Conversation (2005) by John Canemaker
 Yonna in the Solitary Fortress (2006) by Takeuchi Kengo / 竹内 謙吾
 Negadon: The Monster from Mars / 惑星大怪獣ネガドン (2005) by Awazu Jun / 粟津 順
 Best of Ottawa 2006
 studio aka showcase

2007 (23 November to 1 December)

Selected Film Programme 
 Tekkon Kinkreet / 鉄コン筋クリート (2006) by Michael Arias
 Khan Kluay (2006) by Kompin Kemgumnird
 Blood Tea and Red String (2006) by Christiane Cegavske
 Tokyo Loop (2007)
 5cm per second by Shinkai Makoto / 新海 誠
 Komaneko - The Curious Cat (2006) by Gōda Tsuneo / 合田 経郎
 I am a Bear (2006) by Gōda Tsuneo / 合田 経郎
 Gisaku (2006) by Baltasar Pedrosa
 Freedom Project (2006)
 Moebius Redux (2007) by Hasko Baumann
The Pixar Story (2007) by Leslie Iwerks

2008 (24 October to 2 November) 
The 5th Animation Nation festival was held from 24 October to 2 November 2008 at Alliance Française de Singapour and the National Museum of Singapore's Gallery Theatre. Other venues include the Fusionopolis and the library@esplanade.

Selected Film Programme 
 The Piano Forest (2007) by Kojima Masayuki / 小島 正幸
 Sita Sings The Blues (2008) by Nina Paley
 Idiots and Angels (2008) with Hot Dog (2008) by Bill Plympton
 Genius Party (2008)
 Fear(s) of the Dark (2007) by Blutch, Charles Burns, Marie Caillou, Pierre Di Sciullo, Lorenzo Mattotti, Richard McGuire
 Tachigui: The Amazing Lives of the Fast Food Grifters (2006) by Oshii Mamoru / 押井守
 Nocturna (2007) by Víctor Maldonado and Adrià García
 One night in one city (2007) by Jan Balej
 Freedom Project 1 - 7 (2007)
 Dead Space: Downfall (2008) by Chuck Patton

2009 (14 to 21 October)

Selected Film Programme 
 Secret of Kells (2009) by Tomm Moore and Nora Twomey
 Mary and Max (2009) by Adam Elliot
 Waltz with Bashir (2008) by Ari Folman
 Musashi: The Dream of the Last Samurai (2009) by Nishikubo Mizuho / 西久保 瑞穂
 Barefoot Gen / はだしのゲン (1983) by Masaki Mori / 真崎 守
 Barefoot Gen 2 / はだしのゲン2 (1986) by Hirata Toshio / 平田 敏夫
 From Inside (2008) by John Bergin
 A Town Called Panic (Panique au village) (2009) by Stéphane Aubier and Vincent Patar
 Pleasant Goat and Big Big Wolf: The Super Adventure / 喜洋洋与灰太狼之牛气冲天 (2009)
 Genius Party Beyond (2008)
 Usavich (2006-9) by Tomioka Satoshi / 富岡 聡

References

External links 
Singapore Film Society official website

Animation film festivals
Film festivals in Singapore
Recurring events established in 2004